The Swiss Academy of Sciences (SCNAT) is a Swiss national association founded in 1815. In German, French and Italian (the official languages of Switzerland) the name is Akademie der Naturwissenschaften Schweiz, Académie suisse des sciences naturelles, and Accademia svizzera di scienze naturali respectively.

The Swiss Academy of Sciences is part of the Swiss Academies of Arts and Sciences, and awards the annual Prix Schläfli. In 2015 the SCNAT network included over 35,000 experts in over 130 societies in all cantons.

The 2021 president is Philipp Moreillon.

See also 
 Academy of sciences
 Life Sciences Switzerland
 Science and technology in Switzerland

Notes and references

External links 
 

Switzerland
Science and technology in Switzerland
1815 establishments in Switzerland
Scientific organizations established in 1815